Jef Dominicus (13 April 1913 – 8 December 2001) was a Dutch racing cyclist. He rode in the 1938 Tour de France.

References

1913 births
2001 deaths
Dutch male cyclists
Place of birth missing